Valerie Ganz (1936–2015) was a Welsh artist, known for her paintings of South Wales coal miners.

Life and work
Ganz grew up in Mumbles of Swansea. She studied art in Swansea then worked as a teacher and lecturer. In 1973 she left teaching to concentrate full-time on painting.

She developed an interest in the industrial heritage and landscapes of South Wales. During the 1980s she spent several days a week underground at 14 coal mines, sketching the miners at work. Her work was exhibited at the Glynn Vivian Gallery, Swansea, in 1986.

She held her last major art exhibition in 2010 at the Attic Gallery in Swansea. She is an elected member of the Royal Cambrian Academy.

Fourteen of Ganz's paintings are held in UK public collections, including the National Coal Mining Museum for England, the National Library of Wales and the National Museum of Wales.

She died suddenly on 28 September 2015 aged 79, after struggling with ill health.

References

External links
 

1936 births
2015 deaths
20th-century Welsh painters
20th-century Welsh women artists
21st-century Welsh painters
21st-century Welsh women artists
Artists from Swansea
Welsh women painters